Scott Moncrieff may refer to:

 Colin Scott-Moncrieff (1836–1916), Scottish engineer, soldier and civil servant
 C. K. Scott Moncrieff (1889–1930), Scottish writer and translator
 George Scott-Moncrieff (1910–1974), Scottish writer and journalist
 George Kenneth Scott-Moncrieff (1855–1924), Scottish soldier and engineer
 Lucy Scott-Moncrieff (born 1954), British judge
 Robert Scott Moncrieff (1793–1869), Scottish advocate and artist

See also

 
 
 Scomo (disambiguation)
 Scott (disambiguation)
 Moncrieff (disambiguation)